Dhanyal (Urdu: دھنیال‎, or Dhanyal) is one of the biggest tribe living in Potohar level and Lower Himalayas throughout the previous eight centuries. This tribe follows its genealogy to Hazrat Ali Ibne Talib (R.A.) Dhanyal tribe consists of Hazrat Ali's descendants. Moaazam Shah prestigious as Dhanni Peer is ancestor of Dhanyal Tribe. Dhanyals are not Fatmi descendants of Hazrat Ali (RazilAllah Anha). They have a place with Hazrat Ali's ninth spouse Hazrat Khola bint-e-Ayas bin Jaffar Bannu Hanifa. Hazrat Khola brought forth Hazrat Ali's celebrated child Muhammad bin Ali known as Muhammad bin Hanfia.
A large portion of the Dhanyals are settled in the urban communities of Rawalpindi, Islamabad and in Kotli Sattian and Murree Hills. Some different parts of the tribe live in kashmir, Abbottabad, Sialkot and Hazara.

Origin
The origin of Dhanni Peer is as follows

Hazrat Ali Ibne Talib (R.A.)
Muhammad ibn Hanfiyya
Ibrhaim
Hasan
Zayd
Ismail
Hasan al At'rush
Qasim
Hassan
Ibrahim
Ali
Muhammad
Abdullah
Muawiya
Jafar
Amir Malik
Khusro Shah
Muazam Shah known as Dhani Pir

History
The name 'Dhanyal' is from Mohazzam Shah, which was the name of a chief and renowned Sufi holy person of Lower Himalayas who moved from Dhanni (old name of Chakwal) in late twelfth century. Ancestors of Mohazzam Shah who were Arab Muslims relocated from Iraq into Multan during the time of Shahab Ud Din Muhammad Ghori. Descendants of Mohazzam Shah managed Multan state for around 190 years. Mohazzam Shah upheld Muhammad Ghori to check the exercises of Hindu Rajputs who forcefully assaulted Muslim army of Muhammad Ghori. Because of the impact of the Mohazzam Shah known as Hazrat Baba Dhanni Pir, numerous non-Muslims of this space changed over to Islam. Mohazzam Shah was the profound head of Dhanyal, Satti and Abbasi tribe in the space of Murree Hills, plain space of Potohar and Kashmir.

Hazrat Baba Dhanni Pir's grave is in Mouri Sayyaedan, a valley on Lehtrar Road in tehsil Kotli Sattian, District Rawalpindi, Pakistan.

Misconception
There is a general misconception about Dhanyal tribe. During the period of British rule, they were included as Rajput tribe in 1891, 1901, 1911 and 1931 census. They are not Rajput, but Alvis.

Some from Dhanyal tribe write the title "Raja" with their names, which doesn't imply that the tribe is any offshot of Rajput – they are Alvi and Arab Muslims like Awan and Shaikh or Qureshi, Abbasi and Sayed. Some individual from the tribe called themselves as Shah, it does not implies that they are Sayed, it is demonstrated that Dhanyals are non-fatimi relatives of Hazrat Ali Al-Murtaza (RA).

Dhanyals are renowned for their valiance. Individuals from this tribe were enlisted into the armies of the Mughal Empire, British Empire and after Independence, into the Pakistan Army. After independence, the Dhanyals in metropolitan regions have gone to different fields like training, medication, designing, business and sociologies.

See also 
Tribes and clans of the Pothohar Plateau
Awan (tribe)

References

Further reading
Khalid Walayat Dhanyal 2009, May 14, M.S. Asimov, Vadim Mikhaĭlovich Masson, Ahmad Hasan Dani, Unesco, Clifford Edmund Bosworth, Muḣammad Osimī, János Harmatta, Boris.   
Abramovich Litvinovskiĭ (1992). Clifford Edmund Bosworth, Muḣammad Osimī. ed. History of Civilizations of Central Asia. 4. Paris.
Motilal Banarsidass Publ., 1999. pp. 485. .

Social groups of Pakistan
Punjabi tribes
Hindkowan tribes
Tribes of Rawalpindi District